Cities and towns in Sri Muktsar Sahib district

Hari Ke Kalan village is located in the Sri Muktsar Sahib district of Punjab, India. It is situated 22km away from Sri Muktsar Sahib, which is both district & sub-district headquarters of the village. The total geographical area of the village is 2854 hectares. Hari Ke Kalan has a total population of 8,024 people, out of which the male population is 4,212 while the female population is 3,812. The literacy rate of Hari Ke Kalan village is 51.57% out of which 55.48% of males and 47.25% of females are literate.

Hari Ke Kalan village is administrated by a sarpanch who is the elected representative of the village by the local elections. As per 2019 stats, Harike Kalan village comes under Gidderbaha assembly constituency & Faridkot parliamentary constituency. Bariwala is nearest town to Harike kalan village for all major economic activities.

Amenities 
The village has a Punjab National Bank Branch located at its center. There are two petrol pumps situated on the north side of the village. A car wash station is established on the southern end of the village.  A water works on the southern side of the village provide every household in the village with clean drinking water.